Stansfield Hall railway station was the second station in Stansfield, Todmorden in West Yorkshire, England and was situated on the Copy Pit line. It opened in 1869 and the last train called in 1944 but was not officially closed until 1949.

The station took its name from the nearby residence of Stansfield Hall and the township of Stansfield. The station was of note as a calling point for some trains travelling between Halifax and Burnley, because these could not call at the larger Todmorden station without a reversal.

References
Footnotes

Bibliography

External links
 Stansfield Hall station (shown closed) on navigable 1947 O. S. map

Disused railway stations in Calderdale
Former Lancashire and Yorkshire Railway stations
Railway stations in Great Britain opened in 1869
Railway stations in Great Britain closed in 1949
Todmorden
1869 establishments in England